Kütahya Archaeological Museum is a museum in Kütahya, Turkey.

The museum is located in the Vacidiye Medrese, a historical medrese (Islamic school) building commissioned by the Germinyanid ruler Umur in 1314. In 1965 it was opened as a museum. After a period of restoration it was reopened on 5 March 1999.

The building material is cut stone and the portal is of Seljukid style. There are nine rooms. The exhibits span the Paleolithic, Chalcolithic, Bronze Age, Hittite, Phrygian, Hellenistic, Roman, Byzantine, Seljukid and Ottoman eras. The oldest items are painted ceramics from Hacılar.

One interesting item is a sarcophagus of a supposed Amazon, a rare specimen.

References

External links
Virtual tour

Buildings and structures in Kütahya Province
Archaeological museums in Turkey
Madrasas in Turkey
1965 establishments in Turkey
1314 works
Museums established in 1965
Tourist attractions in Kütahya Province